The Kamikaze is made of equal parts vodka, triple sec and lime juice. Garnish is typically a wedge or twist of lime. Kamikaze is a Japanese word literally meaning "divine wind". Dozens of variations exist in online databases today. Some include the addition of 
cane sugar.

See also
 Gimlet (cocktail)

References

External links 
 

Cocktails with lime juice
Cocktails with triple sec or curaçao
Cocktails with vodka
Sour cocktails